The 2006 Saskatchewan Roughriders finished 3rd place in the West Division with a 9–9 record. They appeared in the West Final where they lost to the eventual Grey Cup champions BC Lions.

Offseason

CFL draft

Preseason

Regular season

Season standings

Season schedule

Roster

Awards and records

CFL All-Star Selections
Eddie Davis, Defensive Back
Gene Makowsky, Offensive Tackle
Jeremy O'Day, Centre
Fred Perry, Defensive End

Western All-Star Selections
Eddie Davis, Defensive Back
Matt Dominguez, Receiver
Reggie Hunt, Linebacker
Kenton Keith, Running Back
Gene Makowsky, Offensive Tackle
Jeremy O'Day, Centre
Fred Perry, Defensive End

Milestones

Playoffs

West Semi-Final

West Final

References

Saskatchewan Roughriders
Saskatchewan Roughriders seasons